Robert Lloyd Griffin (February 12, 1929 – February 25, 2012) was a professional American football player who played linebacker for six seasons for the Los Angeles Rams and St. Louis Cardinals. Griffin played college football at the University of Arkansas and was selected in the second round of the 1952 NFL Draft by the Los Angeles Rams.

References

External links
 

1929 births
2012 deaths
American football linebackers
Arkansas Razorbacks football players
Los Angeles Rams players
St. Louis Cardinals (football) players
United States Marine Corps personnel of the Korean War
United States Marines
Sportspeople from Fort Worth, Texas
Atlanta Falcons coaches